On The Broad Stairway, from Edison Studios, was a 1913 American silent film (short) written and directed by J. Searle Dawley. The film was the second of three "Kate Kirby's Cases"  detective tales produced in 1913 before Dawley and actress Laura Sawyer left Edison to continue the series later that year with the Famous Players Film Company. On The Broad Stairway was released in the United States on July 19, 1913.

Plot
Described as "being another of 'Kate Kirby's Cases', a series of detective stories", the plot summary in The Edison Kinetogram was:

Cast
 May Abbey as Marguerite Osborn, the bride's older sister
 Robert Brewer as Inspector Dalton
 Bigelow Cooper as Philip Morton, the groom
 Bessie Learn as Alice Osborn, the bride
 Charles Ogle as Kate's father, an ex-detective
 Laura Sawyer as Detective Kate Kirby

Review

The Moving Picture World

{{blockquote|On The Broad Stairway (Edison). July 19. — This very good detective story, by J. Searle Dawley, is the second in the "Kate Kirby Cases" and makes what probably is the best regular release of the last two weeks. The situation at the opening is finely dramatic and it gets a tremendous impetus from the early development of the plot. At the start, we find Bigelow Cooper and Bessie Learn about to be married. Bigelow has discovered that Bessie's older sister, May Abbey, is the one whom he really loves. She returns his love; but won't hear of his breaking Bessie's heart and insists on his going on with the ceremony. She has been interrupted while writing a note to him to this effect, and has slipped it down beside a settle. A few moments later the bride-to-be is found dead on the broad stairway. When the detectives come, it is found that Bigelow's knife killed her, and when May's unfinished note is also found, it looks as though he had murdered her. May does not know that he is innocent, nor does the spectator. One of the detectives is a woman, Laura Sawyer, and when the inspector, Robert Brewer, tries to wring the truth out of May, her sympathies are so worked up that she goes out to make further investigations, believing they will clear May and Bigelow. This we think is the picture's most brilliant scene; but the whole of it is very clever. The acting, photography and direction are all worthy of the best commendation.}}

 Kate Kirby's cases
 The Diamond Crown. (Edison – 1913) 
 On the Broad Stairway. (Edison – 1913) 
 The Substitute Stenographer. (Edison – 1913) 
 Chelsea 7750. (Famous Players  - 1913)
 An Hour Before Dawn. (Famous Players  - 1913)
 The Port of Doom''. (Famous Players  - 1913)

Sources

External links
 

American silent short films
American black-and-white films
1913 films
Films directed by J. Searle Dawley
1910s English-language films
1910s American films